Olga Albizu Rosaly (1924–2005) was an abstract expressionist painter from Ponce, Puerto Rico. Albizu Rosaly was the first woman dedicated to abstraction in Puerto Rico.

Life
Albizu was born and raised in Puerto Rico, where she studied painting with the Spanish painter Esteban Vicente from 1943 to 1947. She received a B.A. from the University of Puerto Rico in 1946. In 1948 she moved to New York City on a fellowship for post-graduate work at the Art Students League, where she studied under Morris Kantor, Carl Holty, and Vaclav Vytlacil. She also studied with Hans Hofmann and subsequently became his apprentice. After that, she did further studies in Europe at the Académie de la Grande Chaumière in Paris and the Accademia di Belle Arti in Florence. Later, she spent a year painting in the Provence, as painters such as Van Gogh and Cézanne had done before her. In 1953 she returned to New York.

Works
Her works have been used in the artwork of various record covers, including a number of albums by Stan Getz.
Stan Getz:
Jazz Samba
Jazz Samba Encore!
Getz/Gilberto
Getz/Gilberto Vol. 2
Big Band Bossa Nova
Bill Evans: 
Trio 64
Alibizu's work was included in the Smithsonian American Art Museum's 2013 exhibit, "Our America: The Latino Presence in American Art," and her work, "Radiante" (1967), is part of the collection and was used as one of several new banners at the entrance to the Museum in 2017.

Awards
Honored at Ponce's Park of the Illustrious Ponce Citizens.
2nd prize, Ateneo Puertorriqueño, Puerto Rico 1967
2nd prize, Esso Salon of Young Artists, San Juan, Puerto Rico 1964

References

External links
 
 Olga Albizu on WikiArt

Further reading
 Fay Fowlie de Flores. Ponce, Perla del Sur: Una Bibliográfica Anotada. Second Edition. 1997. Ponce, Puerto Rico: Universidad de Puerto Rico en Ponce. p. 56. Item 286. 
 Carmen Teresa Ruiz de Fischler. "Olaga Albizu, Myrna Baez y Luisa Geigel: tres mujeres pioneras en las artes plásticas." Proyecto de recopilación de datos sobre las artes plásticas en Puerto Rico. Homines. Issue 10 (1986-1987) pp. 366–384.

1924 births
2005 deaths
Puerto Rican painters
Puerto Rican women painters
Painters from Ponce
American women painters
Alumni of the Académie de la Grande Chaumière
20th-century American painters
University of Puerto Rico alumni
20th-century American women artists